The Advertiser News is a weekly broadsheet newspaper published every Wednesday in Spring Hill, Tennessee.

It was first published in October 2003 by founder Jeff Bryant, his wife Karen Bryant, and sales specialist David Hancock. The business was sold to Las Vegas-based Stephens Media in 2005.

References

External links
 Advertiser News
 Stephens Media
 City of Spring Hill, Tennessee

Newspapers published in Tennessee
2003 establishments in Tennessee
Publications established in 2003